"Somethin' Like This" is a song recorded by American country music artist Joe Diffie.  It was released in August 1997 as the second single from the album Twice Upon a Time.  The song reached #40 on the Billboard Hot Country Singles & Tracks chart.  The song was written by Michael Higgins and Ron Williams.

Chart performance

References

1997 singles
1997 songs
Joe Diffie songs
Epic Records singles